Hyblaea dilatata is a moth in the family Hyblaeidae described by Max Gaede in 1917.

References

Hyblaeidae